Bertrand Creek is a stream in the U.S. state of Washington and the Canadian province of British Columbia.  Bertrand Creek is 9.8 miles long and drains into the Nooksack River 3 miles south of Lynden.  This cross-border stream is the largest lowland tributary of the Nooksack River.

Bertrand Creek was named after James Bertrand, a pioneer settler.

See also
List of rivers of Washington
List of rivers of British Columbia

References

Rivers of Whatcom County, Washington
Rivers of Washington (state)